Savor or Savour may refer to:

Savoriness or umami, one of the five generally recognised basic tastes
Savor, Hisense's white goods brand name
Savor, a memoir by Pakistani-American chef Fatima Ali published posthumously in 2022
"Savour", a song by Tim Smith from Tim Smith's Extra Special OceanLandWorld
"Savour", a song by William D. Drake from Leader of the Starry Skies: A Tribute to Tim Smith, Songbook 1

See also
Saver (disambiguation)
Savory (disambiguation)